Events in the year 1912 in Germany.

Incumbents

National level
 Kaiser – Wilhelm II
 Chancellor – Theobald von Bethmann Hollweg

State level

Kingdoms
 King of Bavaria – Otto of Bavaria
 King of Prussia – Kaiser Wilhelm II
 King of Saxony – Frederick Augustus III of Saxony
 King of Württemberg – William II of Württemberg

Grand Duchies
 Grand Duke of Baden – Frederick II
 Grand Duke of Hesse – Ernest Louis
 Grand Duke of Mecklenburg-Schwerin – Frederick Francis IV
 Grand Duke of Mecklenburg-Strelitz – Adolphus Frederick V
 Grand Duke of Oldenburg – Frederick Augustus II
 Grand Duke of Saxe-Weimar-Eisenach – William Ernest

Principalities
 Schaumburg-Lippe – Adolf II, Prince of Schaumburg-Lippe
 Schwarzburg-Rudolstadt – Günther Victor, Prince of Schwarzburg
 Schwarzburg-Sondershausen – Günther Victor, Prince of Schwarzburg
 Principality of Lippe – Leopold IV, Prince of Lippe
 Reuss Elder Line – Heinrich XXIV, Prince Reuss of Greiz (with Heinrich XIV, Prince Reuss Younger Line as regent)
 Reuss Younger Line – Heinrich XIV, Prince Reuss Younger Line
 Waldeck and Pyrmont – Friedrich, Prince of Waldeck and Pyrmont

Duchies
 Duke of Anhalt – Frederick II, Duke of Anhalt
 Duke of Brunswick – Duke John Albert of Mecklenburg (regent)
 Duke of Saxe-Altenburg – Ernst II, Duke of Saxe-Altenburg
 Duke of Saxe-Coburg and Gotha – Charles Edward, Duke of Saxe-Coburg and Gotha
 Duke of Saxe-Meiningen – Georg II, Duke of Saxe-Meiningen

Colonial Governors
 Cameroon (Kamerun) – .... Hansen (acting governor) to 29 March, then Karl Ebermaier (1st term)
 Kiaochow (Kiautschou) – Alfred Meyer-Waldeck
 German East Africa (Deutsch-Ostafrika) – Georg Albrecht Freiherr von Rechenberg to 22 April, then Albert Heinrich Schnee
 German New Guinea (Deutsch-Neuguinea) – Albert Hahl (2nd term)
 German Samoa (Deutsch-Samoa) – Erich Schultz-Ewerth
 German South-West Africa (Deutsch-Südwestafrika) – Theodor Seitz
 Togoland – Edmund Brückner to 19 June, then Duke Adolf Friedrich of Mecklenburg

Events
 January 12 – German federal election, 1912
 October 17 – Krupp engineers Benno Strauss and Eduard Maurer patent austenitic stainless steel 
 December 6 – The Nefertiti bust was found at Amarna by the German Oriental Company (Deutsche Orient-Gesellschaft – DOG), led by German archaeologist Ludwig Borchardt.
 December 24 – Merck files patent applications in Germany for synthesis of the entactogenic drug MDMA (Ecstasy), developed by Anton Köllisch.

Undated
 German company Fresenius is founded by Eduard Fresenius.
 Alfred Wegener proposes a fully formulated theory of continental drift and gave the supercontinent Pangaea its name.
 Max von Laue suggests using crystal lattices to diffract X-rays.
 Neosalvarsan becomes available and supersedes the more toxic and less water-soluble salvarsan as an effective treatment for syphilis.

Births

 16 January – Willy Kaiser, German boxer (died 1986)
 21 January – Konrad Emil Bloch, German biochemist (died 2000)
 1 February – Erich Campe, German boxer (died 1977)
 5 February – Hedwig Potthast, German secretary and mistress of Heinrich Himmler (died 1997)
 18 February – Heinz Kühn, German politician (died 1992)
 24 February – Ulrich de Maizière, German general (died 2006)
 3 March – Klaus Gysi, politician (died 1999)
 4 March – Ferdinand Leitner, German conductor (died 1996)
 6 March – Klaus von Bismarck, German journalist (died 1997)
 13 March – Carl Raddatz, German actor (died 2004)
 22 March – Alfred Schwarzmann, German gymnast (died 2000)
 23 March – Wernher von Braun, German aerospace engineer and space architect (died 1977)
 29 March – Hanna Reitsch, German soldier and pilot (d. 1979)
 31 March – Hermann Höcherl, German politician (died 1989)
 29 April – Moshe Landau, German-born Israeli jurist and president of the Supreme Court of Israel (died 2011)
 2 May:
 Axel Springer, German journalist (died 1985)
 Karl Adam, German rowing coach (died 1976)
 9 May – Fritz Sennheiser, German electrical engineer and entrepreneur, founder of Sennheiser (died 2010)
 1 June – Oswald Lange, German aerospace engineer (died 2012)
 5 June – Josef Neckermann, German equestrian and businessman (died 1992)
 11 June - Bruno von Freytag-Löringhoff, German philosopher, mathematician and epistemologist  (died 1996)
 21 June – Toni Merkens, German cyclist (died 1944)
 28 June – Carl Friedrich von Weizsäcker, German physicist (died 2007)
 30 June – Ludwig Bölkow, German aeronautical pioneers of Germany (died 2003)
 9 July 
 Willi Stadel, German gymnast (died [1999)
 Albrecht Obermaier, German naval officer (died 2004)
 28 July – Charles Augustus, Hereditary Grand Duke of Saxe-Weimar-Eisenach (died 1988)
 3 August:
 Fritz Hellwig, German politician (died 2017)
 Richard Holm, German operatic tenor (died 1988)
 14 August – Erwin Strittmatter, German writer (died 1994)
 31 August – Helmut Hamann, German athlete (died 1941)
 2 September – Ingeborg Rapoport, German pediatrician (died 2017)
 19 September – Kurt Sanderling, German conductor (died 2011)
 14 October – Albert Richter, German cyclist (died 1940)
 1 November –  Gunther Plaut, German-born Canadian rabbi and writer (died 2013)
 28 November – Heinz Galinski, President of Central Council of Jews in Germany (died 1992)
 29 November – Günther Smend, German officer (died 1944)
 Date unknown
Hans Metzger, former German diplomat
Elisabeth Schmid, German archaeologist and osteologist (died 1994)

Deaths
8 January – Friedrich Schrempf, editor and member of the Reichstag (born 1858)
5 February – Botho zu Eulenburg (born 1831)
8 February – Wilhelm von Hahnke, German fieldmarshall (born 1833)
5 March – Rochus von Liliencron, German germanist and historian (born 1820)
12 March – Friedrich Karl Wilhelm Dönitz, German physician, anatomist, zoologist and entomologist (born 1838)
30 March – Karl May, German writer (born 1842)
30 July – Friedrich Schulze, German architect (born 1843)
10 August – Paul Wallot, German architect (born 1841)
24 September – Adolf Marschall von Bieberstein, German politician (born 1842)
10 October – Rudolf Arnold Nieberding, German politician (born 1888)
27 October – Friedrich zu Limburg-Stirum, German diplomat and politician (born 1835)
22 November – Otto Lessing, German sculptor (born 1846)
28 November – Otto Brahm, German drama and literary critic (born 1856)
23 December – Otto Schoetensack, German industrialist and later professor of anthropology (born 1850)
30 December – Alfred von Kiderlen-Waechter, German diplomat and politician (born 1852)

References

 
Years of the 20th century in Germany
Germany
Germany